Fritzchen may refer to:

An endearing diminutive of the name Friedrich->Fritz->Fritzchen
Codename of Eddie Chapman
Little Fritz, butt of German jokes, akin to Little Johnny
Fritzchen (film), an upcoming American film directed by Joko Anwar